The 2003 Czech Figure Skating Championships were held in Brno between December 20 and 22, 2003. Skaters competed in the disciplines of men's singles, ladies' singles, pair skating, and ice dancing.

Senior results

Men

Ladies

Pairs

Ice dancing

External links
 results

2002 in figure skating
Czech Figure Skating Championships, 2003
Czech Figure Skating Championships
2003 in Czech sport